Colum may refer to:

People
 Given name
 Colum Corless (1922–2015), Irish hurler
 Lord Colum Crichton-Stuart (1886–1957), British Conservative Party politician
 Colum Eastwood (born 1983), Irish nationalist politician
 Colum Halpenny (born 1979), rugby league player
 Colum Kenny (active from 1992), Irish author and academic
 Colum McCann (born 1965), Irish writer of literary fiction
 Colum Sands (born 1951), Irish singer-songwriter
 William St Colum Bland (1868–1950), British Army officer

 Surname
 Mary Colum (1884–1957), Irish literary critic and author
 Padraic Colum (1881–1972), a leading figure of the Irish Literary Revival

Other uses
 St. Colum's GAA, a sports club in County Cork, Ireland
the trade name of Mepenzolate

See also
 Colm, an Irish given name
 Colom (disambiguation)
 

Irish-language masculine given names
Surnames of Irish origin